The following books are set in the fictional world of Darkover and were written, co-authored, edited or started by Marion Zimmer Bradley.


Related books
The early novels Falcons of Narabedla and The Door Through Space are listed by some sources as part of the Darkover series (as noted below), but although they presage some themes and images with the main sequence, these do not take place on Darkover, and are in other ways inconsistent with the series.  Clute and Nicholls (1995) describes these as "marginally linked" to Darkover.

References

Darkover
Darkover books